Nancy Bernstein (September 10, 1960 – September 18, 2015) was an American visual effects producer at Digital Domain and later Head of Production at DreamWorks Animation. She produced DreamWorks' 2012 film Rise of the Guardians.

Death 
Bernstein died in September 2015 at the age of 55. She had stage IV colorectal cancer that metastasized to her lungs. She was initially diagnosed in December 2011. 

DreamWorks Animation's Kung Fu Panda 3 was dedicated to her memory.

References

External links 
 

1960 births
2015 deaths
American animated film producers
American film producers
LGBT film producers
Visual effects artists
DreamWorks Animation people
Tulane University alumni
Deaths from colorectal cancer